The Athletics at the 2016 Summer Paralympics – Women's 200 metres T11 event at the 2016 Paralympic Games took place on 13 September 2016, at the Estádio Olímpico João Havelange.

Heats

Heat 1 
11:26 12 September 2016:

Heat 2 
11:34 12 September 2016:

Heat 3 
11:42 12 September 2016:

Heat 4 
11:50 12 September 2016:

Heat 5 
11:58 12 September 2016:

Semifinals

Semifinal 1 
19:43 12 September 2016:

Semifinal 2 
19:49 12 September 2016:

Semifinal 3 
19:55 12 September 2016:

Final 
19:42 13 September 2016:

Notes

Athletics at the 2016 Summer Paralympics